Events in the year 1700 in Norway.

Incumbents
Monarch: Frederick IV

Events
22 February – Great Northern War starts.
1 March – The Gregorian calendar is adopted.
18 August – The Peace of Travendal is concluded when Denmark-Norway signs a peace treaty at Traventhal House in Holstein. Denmark-Norway has to withdraw from Holstein and Sweden withdraws from Denmark. The peace will last for the next 10 years.
The Kvitsøy bucket light is established.

Arts and literature

Around 1700
 The poem Stolt Anne is written by Hans Paus.

Births

18 August – Lars Pinnerud, woodcarver (died 1762).

Deaths
Johannes Skraastad, woodcarver (born c.1648).

See also

References